Trolley wire may refer to:

Overhead line, used to transmit electricity to trains, trams and trolleybuses
Trolley Wire, magazine published by the Sydney Tramway Museum